Richard Hefter (March 20, 1941 – May 6, 2011) was an American author of books for young children.

Biography
Richard Hefter met children's author Jacquelyn Reinach in 1975. He was contracted at the time to write 26 books for the publishers Holt. After the contract expired he formed a publishing venture, Euphrosyne, with Reinach.

He is known as the creator of Stickybear and as the co-creator (with Reinach) and illustrator for the Sweet Pickles library of books, and for the Strawberry Library of First Learning. The Sweet Pickles series went on to sell 40 million copies. Hefter described his aim as "trying to help children understand things like shyness, laziness and embarrassment in a humorous way."

In 1982, Hefter formed a computer software company, Optimum Resource. He died in 2011 in Hilton Head Island, South Carolina.

Works 
The Strawberry Library of First Learning is a series of books written and illustrated by Hefter. Mr. Hefter is best known as the creator of Stickybear and as the illustrator for the Sweet Pickles library of books.  All of the books in the Strawberry Library have a strawberry depicted somewhere on the cover. Many of the books in this series star Stickybear or other anthropomorphic animal

All were originally published by McGraw-Hill, Grosset & Dunlap, and Optimum Resources.
 A Noise in the Closet (1974) 
 The Strawberry Book of Shapes (1977) 
 One Bear, Two Bears: The Strawberry Number Book (1980) 
 The Strawberry Book of Colors (1980) 
 Some, More, Most (Written By Judy Freudberg and Illustrated by Richard Hefter) 
 Yes and No: A Book of Opposites 
 The Strawberry Mother Goose (Written by Lawrence Di Fiori and Illustrated by Richard Hefter) 
 Noses and Toes: An Up and Down and in and Out Book 
 An Animal Alphabet 
 One White Crocodile Smile: A Number Book 
 Things that Go 
 The Strawberry Look Book 
 The Strawberry Word Book 
 Strawberry Picture Dictionary  
 Bears at Work 
 Stickybear Book of Weather 
 Jobs for Bears (1983) 
 Watch Out! The Stickybear Book of Safety (1983) 
 Lots of Little Bears: A Stickbear Counting Book (1983) 
 Bears Away From Home (1983) 
 Where is the Bear? (1983) 
 Neat Feet (1983) 
 Babysitter Bears (1983) 
 Fast Food (1983)

Other software
 Old Ironsides, a naval combat game by Hefter and Jack Rice.
 Chivalry (1985), a medieval adventure game co-written by Hefter and Janie and Steve Worthington.

References 

American children's writers
American children's book illustrators
1941 births
2011 deaths